Mountain Trade and Development Bank is a commercial bank in South Sudan. It is licensed by the Bank of South Sudan, the central bank and national banking regulator.

Mountain Trade and Development Bank is a privately held financial institution, founded by wealthy individuals from the Nuba Mountains, in Southern Kordofan State.

History
Mountain Trade and Development Bank was founded in August 2010, five and one half years after the cessation of hostilities between South Sudan and Sudan and the signing of the Comprehensive Peace Agreement (CPA) in Naivasha, Kenya. With headquarters in the capital city of Juba, the bank has plans to expand to other South Sudanese states.  The board of trustees chairman said the banks aims included "empowering the people from the Nuba Mountains to boost their economic development as well to assist South Sudanese in poverty reduction efforts"

Branch network
, Mountain Trade & Development Bank maintains its headquarters in Juba, the capital of South Sudan and that country's largest city. It also maintains a branch in Nimule, the Eastern Equatoria town at the International border with the Republic of Uganda.

See also
South Sudan Central Bank
South Sudan Economy
South Sudan Banks

References

External links
 Partial Listing of Commercial Banks In South Sudan
 Banks: Who Dares, Wins

Banks of South Sudan
Banks established in 2010
South Sudanese companies established in 2010
Companies based in Juba